Jennifer Chan (born 25 September, year unknown) is a former Hong Kong radio personality, creative director, singer-songwriter, film actress and architect of Chinese and Scottish descent, most active around the late 1980s-2000s.

Career
Chan became a radio personality upon entering a 1987 disk jockey competition held by RTHK. Contestants that year included Vivian Chow and Christopher Wong, with whom Chan would later co-host a number of programmes on Radio 2.

In 1996 Chan released the EP Still Thinking of You, on which she wrote all the music and lyrics. She had a starring role in the 1999 film Dreamtrips, which screened at the 23rd Hong Kong International Film Festival.

She currently resides in Paris, France and is now a registered architect after graduated with a master's degree from the École Nationale Supérieure d'Architecture de Paris-Malaquais.

Discography
1996: Still Thinking of You  (還想你)

Filmography
Heart to Hearts (1988)
Dreamtrips (1999)

References

External links
Jennifer Chan on École Nationale Supérieure d'architecture de Paris-Malaquais
Jennifer Chan on IMDb
Jennifer Chan on Hong Kong Movie Database
Jennifer Chan on DREAMTRIPS
Jennifer Chan on DREAMTRIPS

Year of birth missing (living people)
Living people
20th-century Hong Kong women singers
Hong Kong film actresses